Moojrim is a 1970 Bollywood crime film about a gold medalist who becomes implicated in a murder while trying to save a girl from attackers. Directed by Kewal Misra, the film stars Joy Mukherjee and Kumud Chuggani.

Cast
Joy Mukherjee ...  Gopal
Sapna ...  Manju Singh 
Dev Kumar ...  Ganga Singh / Gangaram 
Jayant ...  Gangaram 
Nishi ...  Saloni 
Brahmachari ...  Gupta 
Hiralal ...  V.P. Iyengar 
Rajan Haksar ...  Moosa 
Kundan
Balwant   
Jayshree T. ...  Rekha 
Meenakshi   
Rekha Chauhan   
Roopali  
Birbal ...  Gyp

Soundtrack

External links
 

1970 films
1970s Hindi-language films
1970s crime action films
Indian crime action films
Films scored by Sonik-Omi